600 Bottles of Wine is an Australian television drama series screening on Network Ten's Eleven in 2018. The series is written by and stars Grace Rouvray. It first screened as a web series in 2017. It is produced by Bec Bignell and Marius Foley’s Cockatoo Co.Lab and directed by Ainslie Clouston.

Plot
600 Bottles of Wine follows the story of Claire, who begins dating again after breaking up with her long term boyfriend. When she makes a connection with a one-night-stand Pat, she looks to her friends for advice on where she stands in the relationship. The series looks at the anti relationship, what dating is really like in an era where no-one says what they mean or what they want.

Cast and characters
 Grace Rouvray as Claire
 Nerida Bronwen as Nat
 Angus McLaren as Pat
 Nancy Denis as Timmie
 Stephanie Baine as Harriet 
 Adam Franklin as Liam
 Gregory Dias as Melvin
 Lara Dignam as Katie 
 Zenia Starr as Olivia
 Elizabeth McLean as Libby 
 Andrew Shaw as Huw
 Ryan Madden as Nick

Episodes
 S1, Ep1 - The Break up
 S1, Ep2 - The Morning After
 S1, Ep3 - The Negroni
 S1, Ep4 - The Umbrella
 S1, Ep5 - The Test
 S1, Ep6 - The Conversation
 S1, Ep7 - The Friend
 S1, Ep8 - The Colleague

International
The series has screened in the UK on BBC Three, in New Zealand on TVNZ's on-demand service and YLE, the Finnish Public Broadcaster. In July 2020 the series was added to Netflix in Australia and New Zealand. It is currently streaming in Canada on CBC Gem.

References

External links
 

10 Peach original programming
2018 Australian television series debuts
2010s Australian drama television series